The Sonic 23 is a Canadian sailboat, that was designed by Joseph D'Alessio and first built in 1981.

Production

The boat was built by Sonic Sailboats Limited in Canada starting in 1981, but is now out of production.

Design

The Sonic 23 is a small recreational keelboat, built predominantly of fibreglass, with wood trim. It has a masthead sloop rig, a transom-hung rudder and a fixed fin keel. It also has a pop-up companionway hatch. It displaces  and carries  of iron ballast.

It has provisions for an outboard motor.

The boat has a PHRF racing average handicap of 228 with a high of 240 and low of 225.

Operational history
In a review Michael McGoldrick wrote, "Many people regard the Sonic as a close approximation of the very popular Tanzer 22, and the hull and sail plan of these two boats are believed to be very similar. However, the Sonic 23 was designed from scratch by Joseph D'Alessio, and it comes with a sightly larger cabin with a better layout. (It has sitting headroom which increases to 6' with the pop top.). The Sonic's interior room may give it the edge over the Tanzer 22 which is known for being a good sailing boat, but which suffers from cabin which appears a little cramped. From this perspective, the Sonic may be a better choice for cruising."

See also
List of sailing boat types

Similar sailboats
Beneteau First 235
Bluenose one-design sloop
Hunter 23
O'Day 23
Paceship 23
Paceship PY 23
Precision 23
Rob Roy 23
Schock 23
Stone Horse
Watkins 23

References

External links

Keelboats
1980s sailboat type designs
Sailing yachts 
Trailer sailers
Sailboat type designs by Joseph D'Alessio
Sailboat types built by Sonic Sailboats Limited